Pronounced Toe-Nay is a studio album by the American gospel music singer Tonéx. It was released via Verity Records and Jive Records in 2000.

It peaked at No. 12 on the Billboard Top Gospel Albums chart.

Critical reception
In a 2010 profile, The New Yorker called Pronounced Toe-Nay a "breakthrough album ... [that] marked the arrival of a major new voice in gospel music," writing that "'Personal Jesus' had a spaced-out funk groove that recalled Sly & the Family Stone."

Track listing

 Radio
 Pronounced Toe-Nay
 It's On Like That (featuring Jaz)
 One Good Reason (featuring Big J)
 The Good Song
 Personal Jesus
 Trinity
 U Send Me
 The 1 U Need
 Real 2 Me
 Why?
 Waiting
 Taxi
 As I Played
 Real With U
 Cry No More
 Make Me Right (featuring ATaQ)
 Restoration
 Untitled (featuring E.B. Williams)
 One Good Reason (92105 Myx)
 P.T. 2001

References

External links
CCM magazine review
Gospel Flava review

2000 albums
Tonéx albums
1997 albums